Norman Cardew (born 7 November 1938) is an English former footballer who made six appearances in the Football League for Darlington. An amateur inside forward, he played for home-town club South Shields either side of his season at Darlington.

References

1938 births
Living people
Footballers from South Shields
English footballers
Association football inside forwards
South Shields F.C. (1936) players
Darlington F.C. players
English Football League players